Andrzej Tadeusz Bonawentura Kościuszko (4 or 12 February 174615 October 1817) was a Polish military engineer, statesman, and military leader who became a national hero in Belarus, France, Lithuania, Poland and the United States. He fought in the Polish–Lithuanian Commonwealth's struggles against Russia and Prussia, and on the US side in the American Revolutionary War. As Supreme Commander of the Polish National Armed Forces, he led the 1794 Kościuszko Uprising.

Kościuszko was born in February 1746, in a manor house on the Mereczowszczyzna estate in Brest Litovsk Voivodeship, then Grand Duchy of Lithuania, a part of the Polish–Lithuanian Commonwealth (now Ivatsevichy District of Belarus). At age 20, he graduated from the Corps of Cadets in Warsaw, Poland. After the start of the civil war in 1768, Kościuszko moved to France in 1769 to study. He returned to the Commonwealth in 1774, two years after the First Partition, and was a tutor in Józef Sylwester Sosnowski's household. In 1776, Kościuszko moved to North America, where he took part in the American Revolutionary War as a colonel in the Continental Army. An accomplished military architect, he designed and oversaw the construction of state-of-the-art fortifications, including those at West Point, New York. In 1783, in recognition of his services, the Continental Congress promoted him to brigadier general.

Upon returning to Poland in 1784, Kościuszko was commissioned as a major general in the Polish–Lithuanian Commonwealth Army in 1789. After the Polish–Russian War of 1792 resulted in the Commonwealth's Second Partition, he commanded an uprising against the Russian Empire in March 1794 until he was captured at the Battle of Maciejowice in October 1794. The defeat of the Kościuszko Uprising that November led to Poland's Third Partition in 1795, which ended the Commonwealth. In 1796, following the death of Tsaritsa Catherine II, Kościuszko was pardoned by her successor, Tsar Paul I, and he emigrated to the United States. A close friend of Thomas Jefferson, with whom he shared ideals of human rights, Kościuszko wrote a will in 1798, dedicating his U.S. assets to the education and freedom of the U.S. slaves. Kościuszko eventually returned to Europe and lived in Switzerland until his death in 1817. The execution of his testament later proved difficult, and the funds were never used for the purpose Kościuszko intended.

Early life
Kościuszko was born in February 1746 in a manor house on the Mereczowszczyzna estate near Kosów in Nowogródek Voivodeship, Grand Duchy of Lithuania, a part of the Polish–Lithuanian Commonwealth. His exact birthdate is unknown; commonly cited are 4 February and 12 February.

Kościuszko was the youngest son of a member of the Szlachta (untitled Polish nobility), Ludwik Tadeusz Kościuszko, an officer in the Polish–Lithuanian Commonwealth Army, and his wife Tekla Ratomska. The family held the Polish Roch III coat of arms. At the time of Tadeusz Kościuszko's birth, the family possessed modest landholdings in the Grand Duchy worked by 31 peasant families.

Tadeusz was baptized in the Catholic church, thereby receiving the names Andrzej, Tadeusz, and Bonawentura. His paternal family was ethnically Lithuanian–Ruthenian and traced their ancestry to Konstanty Fiodorowicz Kostiuszko, a courtier of Polish King and Grand Duke of Lithuania Sigismund I the Old. Kościuszko's maternal family, the Ratomskis, were also Ruthenian.

Modern Belarusian writers interpret his Ruthenian or Lithuanian heritage as Belarusian. He once described himself as a Litvin, a term that denoted inhabitants of the Grand Duchy of Lithuania, within the Polish–Lithuanian Commonwealth. Modern Belarusian Litvinist writers interpret Litvin as designating a Belarusian, before the word "Belarusian" had come into use. His family had become Polonized as early as the 16th century. Like most Polish–Lithuanian nobility of the time, the Kościuszkos spoke Polish and identified with Polish culture.

In 1755, Kościuszko began attending school in Lubieszów but never finished due to his family's financial straits after his father's death in 1758. Poland's King Stanisław August Poniatowski established a Corps of Cadets (Korpus Kadetów) in 1765, at what is now Warsaw University, to educate military officers and government officials. Kościuszko enrolled in the Corps on 18 December 1765, likely thanks to the Czartoryski family's patronage. The school emphasized military subjects and the liberal arts, and after graduating on 20 December 1766, Kościuszko was promoted to chorąży (a military rank roughly equivalent to modern lieutenant). He stayed on as a student instructor and, by 1768, had attained the rank of captain.

European travels
In 1768, civil war broke out in the Polish–Lithuanian Commonwealth, when the Bar Confederation sought to depose King Stanisław August Poniatowski. One of Kościuszko's brothers, Józef, fought on the side of the insurgents. Faced with a difficult choice between the rebels and his sponsors—the King and the Czartoryski family, who favored a gradualist approach to shedding Russian domination—Kościuszko chose to leave Poland. In late 1769, he and a colleague, artist Aleksander Orłowski, were granted royal scholarships; on 5 October, they embarked for Paris. They wanted to further their military education. As foreigners they were barred from enrolling in French military academies, and so they enrolled in the Royal Academy of Painting and Sculpture. There Kościuszko pursued his interest in drawing and painting and took private lessons in architecture from architect Jean-Rodolphe Perronet.

Kościuszko did not give up on improving his military knowledge.  He audited lectures for five years and frequented the libraries of the Paris military academies. His exposure to the French Enlightenment, along with the religious tolerance practiced in the Polish–Lithuanian Commonwealth, strongly influenced his later career. The French economic theory of physiocracy made a particularly strong impression on his thinking. He also developed his artistic skills, and while his career would take him in a different direction, all his life he continued drawing and painting.

In the First Partition of the Polish–Lithuanian Commonwealth in 1772, Russia, Prussia and Austria annexed large swaths of Commonwealth territory and gained influence over the internal politics. When Kościuszko returned home in 1774, he found that his brother Józef had squandered most of the family fortune, and there was no place for him in the Army, as he could not afford to buy an officer's commission.  He took a position as tutor to the family of the magnate, province governor (voivode) and hetman Józef Sylwester Sosnowski and fell in love with the governor's daughter Ludwika.  Their elopement was thwarted by her father's retainers. Kościuszko received a thrashing at their hands, an event that may have led to his antipathy for class distinctions.

In the autumn of 1775 he emigrated to avoid Sosnowski and his retainers. In late 1775 he attempted to join the Saxon army but was turned down and decided to return to Paris. There he learned of the American Revolutionary War outbreak, in which the British colonies in North America had revolted against the British Crown and begun their struggle for independence. The first American successes were well-publicized in France, and the French people and government openly supported the revolutionaries' cause.

American Revolutionary War

On learning of the American Revolution, Kościuszko, a man of revolutionary aspirations, sympathetic to the American cause and an advocate of human rights, sailed for America in June 1776 along with other foreign officers, likely with the help of a French supporter of the American revolutionaries, Pierre Beaumarchais.  On 30 August 1776, Kościuszko submitted an application to the Second Continental Congress. He was assigned to the Continental Army the next day.

Northern region

Kościuszko's first task was building fortifications at Fort Billingsport in Paulsboro, New Jersey, to protect the banks of the Delaware River and prevent a possible British advance up the river to Philadelphia.  He initially served as a volunteer in the employ of Benjamin Franklin, but on 18 October 1776, Congress commissioned him a colonel of engineers in the Continental Army.

In spring 1777, Kościuszko was attached to the Northern Army under Major General Horatio Gates, arriving at the Canada–US border in May 1777. Subsequently, posted to Fort Ticonderoga, he reviewed the defences of what had been one of the most formidable fortresses in North America. His surveys prompted him to strongly recommend the construction of a battery on Sugar Loaf, a high point overlooking the fort.  His prudent recommendation, in which his fellow engineers concurred, was turned down by the garrison commander, Brigadier General Arthur St. Clair.

This proved a tactical blunder: when a British army under General John Burgoyne arrived in July 1777, Burgoyne did exactly what Kościuszko had warned of, and had his engineers place artillery on the hill. With the British in complete control of the high ground, the Americans realized their situation was hopeless and abandoned the fortress with hardly a shot fired in the siege of Ticonderoga. The British advance force nipped hard on the heels of the outnumbered and exhausted Continentals as they fled south. Major General Philip Schuyler, desperate to put distance between his men and their pursuers, ordered Kościuszko to delay the enemy.  Kościuszko designed an engineer's solution: his men felled trees, dammed streams, and destroyed bridges and causeways. Encumbered by their huge supply train, the British began to bog down, giving the Americans the time needed to safely withdraw across the Hudson River.

Gates tapped Kościuszko to survey the country between the opposing armies, choose the most defensible position, and fortify it. Finding just such a spot near Saratoga, overlooking the Hudson at Bemis Heights, Kościuszko laid out a robust array of defences, nearly impregnable. His judgment and meticulous attention to detail frustrated the British attacks during the Battle of Saratoga, and Gates accepted the surrender of Burgoyne's force there on 16 October 1777. The dwindling British army had been dealt a sound defeat, turning the tide to American advantage.  Kościuszko's work at Saratoga received great praise from Gates, who later told his friend Dr. Benjamin Rush: "The great tacticians of the campaign were hills and forests, which a young Polish engineer was skillful enough to select for my encampment."

At some point in 1777, Kościuszko composed a polonaise and scored it for the harpsichord. Named for him, and with lyrics by Rajnold Suchodolski, it later became popular with Polish patriots during the November 1830 Uprising. Around that time, Kościuszko was assigned an African American orderly, Agrippa Hull, whom he treated as an equal and a friend.

In March 1778 Kościuszko arrived at West Point, New York, and spent more than two years strengthening the fortifications and improving the stronghold's defences.  It was these defences that the American General Benedict Arnold subsequently attempted to surrender to the British when he defected.  Soon after Kościuszko finished fortifying West Point, in August 1780, General George Washington granted Kościuszko's request to transfer to combat duty with the Southern Army. Kościuszko's West Point fortifications were widely praised as innovative for the time.

Southern region

After travelling south through rural Virginia in October 1780, Kościuszko proceeded to North Carolina to report to his former commander General Gates.  Following Gates's disastrous defeat at Camden on 16 August 1780, the Continental Congress selected Washington's choice, Major General Nathanael Greene, to replace Gates as commander of the Southern Department.  When Greene formally assumed command on 3 December 1780, he retained Kościuszko as his chief engineer.  By then, he had been praised by both Gates and Greene.

During this campaign, Kościuszko was placed in command of building bateaux, siting the location for camps, scouting river crossings, fortifying positions, and developing intelligence contacts.  Many of his contributions were instrumental in preventing the destruction of the Southern Army.  This was especially so during the "Race to the Dan", when British General Charles Cornwallis chased Greene across  of rough backcountry in January and February 1781.  Thanks largely to a combination of Greene's tactics, Kościuszko's bateaux, and accurate scouting of the rivers ahead of the main body, the Continentals safely crossed each river, including the Yadkin and the Dan.  Cornwallis, having no boats, and finding no way to cross the swollen Dan, abandoned the chase and withdrew into North Carolina.  The Continentals regrouped south of Halifax, Virginia, where Kościuszko had earlier, at Greene's request, established a fortified depot.

During the Race to the Dan, Kościuszko had helped select the site where Greene eventually returned to fight Cornwallis at Guilford Courthouse.  Though tactically defeated, the Americans all but destroyed Cornwallis' army as an effective fighting force and gained a permanent strategic advantage in the South.  Thus, when Greene began his reconquest of South Carolina in the spring of 1781, he summoned Kościuszko to rejoin the main body of the Southern Army.  The combined forces of the Continentals and Southern militia gradually forced the British from the backcountry into the coastal ports during the latter half of 1781 and, on 25 April, Kościuszko participated in the Second Battle of Camden.  At Ninety-Six, Kościuszko besieged the Star Fort from 22 May to 18 June.  During the unsuccessful siege, he suffered his only wound in seven years of service, bayonetted in the buttocks during an assault by the fort's defenders on the approach trench that he was constructing.

Kościuszko subsequently helped fortify the American bases in North Carolina, before taking part in several smaller operations in the final year of hostilities, harassing British foraging parties near Charleston, South Carolina.  After the death of his friend Colonel John Laurens, Kościuszko became engaged in these operations, taking over Laurens's intelligence network in the area. He commanded two cavalry squadrons and an infantry unit, and his last known battlefield command of the war occurred at James Island, South Carolina, on 14 November 1782. In what has been described as the Continental Army's final armed action of the war, he was nearly killed as his small force was routed.  A month later, he was among the Continental troops that reoccupied Charleston following the city's British evacuation. Kościuszko spent the rest of the war there, conducting a fireworks display on 23 April 1783, to celebrate the signing of the Treaty of Paris earlier that month.

Leaving for home
Having not been paid in his seven years of service, in late May 1783, Kościuszko decided to collect the salary owed to him. That year, he was asked by Congress to supervise the fireworks during the 4 July celebrations at Princeton, New Jersey. On 13 October 1783, Congress promoted him to brigadier general, but he still had not received his back pay. Many other officers and soldiers were in the same situation. While waiting for his pay, unable to finance a voyage back to Europe, Kościuszko, like several others, lived on money borrowed from the Polish–Jewish banker Haym Solomon. For the winter of 1783–84, his former commanding officer, General Greene, invited Kościuszko to stay at his mansion. He was inducted into the Society of the Cincinnati and into the American Philosophical Society in 1785. During the Revolution Kościuszko carried an old Spanish sword at his side, which was inscribed with the words, Do not draw me without reason; do not sheathe me without honour.

Polish–Lithuanian Commonwealth
On 15 July 1784, Kościuszko set off for Poland, where he arrived on 26 August. Due to a conflict between his patrons, the Czartoryski family, and King Stanisław August Poniatowski, Kościuszko once again failed to get a commission in the Commonwealth Army. He settled in Siechnowicze. His brother Józef had lost most of the family's lands through bad investments, but with the help of his sister Anna, Kościuszko secured part of the lands for himself.  He decided to limit his male peasants' corvée (obligatory service to the lord of the manor) to two days a week and completely exempted the female peasants. His estate soon stopped being profitable, and he began going into debt. The situation was not helped by the failure of the money promised by the American government—interest on late payment for his seven years' military service—to materialize. Kościuszko struck up friendships with liberal activists; Hugo Kołłątaj offered him a position as lecturer at Kraków's Jagiellonian University, which Kościuszko declined.

Finally, the Great Sejm of 1788–92 introduced some reforms, including a planned build-up of the army to defend the Commonwealth's borders. Kościuszko saw a chance to return to military service and spent some time in Warsaw, among those who engaged in the political debates outside the Great Sejm. He wrote a proposal to create a militia force, on the American model.  As political pressure grew to build up the army, and Kościuszko's political allies gained influence with the King, Kościuszko again applied for a commission, and on 12 October 1789, received a royal commission as a major general, but to Kosciuszko's dismay in the Army of the Kingdom of Poland.  He began receiving the high salary of 12,000 zlotys a year, ending his financial difficulties. On 1 February 1790, he reported for duty in Włocławek, and wrote in a letter after a few days, calling the local inhabitants "lazy" and "careless", in contrast to "good and economical Lithuanians". In the same letter, Kosciuszko begged general Franciszek Ksawery Niesiołowski for a transfer to the Army of the Grand Duchy of Lithuania, but his wishes were not granted. Around summer, he commanded some infantry and cavalry units in the region between the Bug and Vistula Rivers. In August 1790 he was posted to Volhynia, stationed near Starokostiantyniv and Międzyborze. Prince Józef Poniatowski, who happened to be the King's nephew, recognized Kościuszko's superior experience and made him his second-in-command, leaving him in command when he was absent.

Meanwhile, Kościuszko became more closely involved with the political reformers, befriending Hugo Kołłątaj, Julian Ursyn Niemcewicz and others.  Kościuszko argued that the peasants and Jews should receive full citizenship status, as this would motivate them to help defend Poland in the event of war.  The political reformers centered in the Patriotic Party scored a significant victory with adopting the Constitution of 3 May 1791. Kościuszko saw the Constitution as a step in the right direction but was disappointed that it retained the monarchy and did little to improve the situation of the most underprivileged, the peasants and the Jews.  The Commonwealth's neighbors saw the Constitution's reforms as a threat to their influence over Polish internal affairs. A year after the Constitution's adoption, on 14 May 1792, reactionary magnates formed the Targowica Confederation, which asked Russia's Tsaritsa Catherine II for help in overthrowing the Constitution. Four days later, on 18 May 1792, a 100,000-man Russian army crossed the Polish border, headed for Warsaw, beginning the Polish–Russian War of 1792.

Defence of the Constitution

The Russians had a 3:1 advantage in strength, with some 98,000 troops against 37,000 Poles; they also had an advantage in combat experience.  Before the Russians invaded, Kościuszko had been appointed deputy commander of Prince Józef Poniatowski's infantry division, stationed in West Ukraine. When the Prince became Commander-in-Chief of the entire Polish (Crown) Army on 3 May 1792, Kościuszko was given command of a division near Kiev.

The Russians attacked a wide front with three armies. Kościuszko proposed that the entire Polish army be concentrated and engage one of the Russian armies, to assure numerical parity and boost the morale of the most inexperienced Polish forces with a quick victory; but Poniatowski rejected this plan.  On 22 May 1792, the Russian forces crossed the border in Ukraine, where Kościuszko and Poniatowski were stationed. The Crown Army was judged too weak to oppose the four enemy columns advancing into West Ukraine, and began a fighting withdrawal to the western side of the Southern Bug River, with Kościuszko commanding the rear guard.  On 18 June, Poniatowski won the Battle of Zieleńce; Kościuszko's division, on detached rear-guard duty, did not take part in the battle and rejoined the main army only at nightfall; nonetheless, his diligent protection of the main army's rear and flanks won him the newly created Virtuti Militari, to this day Poland's highest military decoration. (Storożyński, however, states that Kościuszko received the Virtuti Militari for his later, 18 July victory at Dubienka.) The Polish withdrawal continued, and on 7 July Kościuszko's forces fought a delaying battle against the Russians at Volodymyr-Volynskyi (the Battle of Włodzimierz). On reaching the northern Bug River, the Polish Army was split into three divisions to hold the river defensive line—weakening the Poles' point of numerical superiority, against Kościuszko's counsel of a single strong, concentrated army.

Kościuszko's force was assigned to protect the front's southern flank, touching up to the Austrian border. At the Battle of Dubienka (18 July 1792), Kościuszko repulsed a numerically superior enemy, skilfully using terrain obstacles and field fortifications, and came to be regarded as one of Poland's most brilliant military commanders of the age. With some 5,300 men, he defeated 25,000 Russians led by General Michail Kachovski. Despite the tactical victory, Kościuszko had to retreat from Dubienka, as the Russians crossed the nearby Austrian border and began flanking his positions.

After the battle, King Stanisław August Poniatowski promoted Kościuszko to lieutenant-general and also offered him the Order of the White Eagle, but Kościuszko, a convinced republican would not accept a royal honor. News of Kościuszko's victory spread over Europe, and on 26 August he received the honorary citizenship of France from the Legislative Assembly of revolutionary France. While Kościuszko considered the war's outcome to still be unsettled, the King requested a ceasefire.  On 24 July 1792, before Kościuszko had received his promotion to lieutenant-general, the King shocked the army by announcing his accession to the Targowica Confederation and ordering the Polish–Lithuanian troops to cease hostilities against the Russians. Kościuszko considered abducting the King as the Bar Confederates had done two decades earlier, in 1771, but was dissuaded by Prince Józef Poniatowski. On 30 August, Kościuszko resigned from his army position and briefly returned to Warsaw, where he received his promotion and pay, but refused the King's request to remain in the Army. Around that time, he also fell ill with jaundice.

Émigré

The King's capitulation was a hard blow for Kościuszko, who had not lost a single battle in the campaign. By mid-September 1792, he was resigned to leaving the country, and in early October, he departed from Warsaw. First, he went east, to the Czartoryski family manor at Sieniawa, which gathered various malcontents. In mid-November, he spent two weeks in Lwów, where he was welcomed by the populace. Since the war's end, his presence had drawn crowds eager to see the famed commander. Izabela Czartoryska discussed having him marry her daughter Zofia. The Russians planned to arrest him if he returned to territory under their control; the Austrians, who held Lwów, offered him a commission in the Austrian Army, which he turned down. Subsequently, they planned to deport him, but he left Lwów before they could do so. At the turn of the month, he stopped in Zamość at the Zamoyskis' estate, met Stanisław Staszic, then went on to Puławy.

He did not tarry long there either: on 12–13 December, he was in Kraków; on 17 December, in Wrocław; and shortly after, he settled in Leipzig, where many notable Polish soldiers and politicians formed an émigré community. Soon he and some others began plotting an uprising against Russian rule in Poland. The politicians, grouped around Ignacy Potocki and Hugo Kołłątaj, sought contacts with similar opposition groups in Poland and by spring 1793 had been joined by other politicians and revolutionaries, including Ignacy Działyński. While Kołłątaj and others had begun planning an uprising before Kościuszko joined them, his support was a significant boon to them, as he was among the most famous individuals in Poland. After two weeks in Leipzig, before the second week of January 1793, Kościuszko set off for Paris, where he tried to gain French support for Poland's planned uprising. He stayed there until summer, but despite the growing revolutionary influence, the French paid only lip service to the Polish cause and refused to commit themselves to anything concrete. Kościuszko concluded that the French authorities were not interested in Poland beyond what use it could have for their cause, and he was increasingly disappointed in the pettiness of the French Revolution—the infighting among different factions, and the growing reign of terror.

On 23 January 1793, Prussia and Russia signed the Second Partition of Poland. The Grodno Sejm, convened under duress in June, ratified the partition and was also forced to rescind the Constitution of 3 May 1791. This came as a shock to the Targowica Confederates, who had seen themselves as defenders of centuries-old privileges of the magnates but had hardly expected that their appeal for help to the Tsarina of Russia would further reduce and weaken their country.

In August 1793, Kościuszko, though worried that an uprising would have little chance against the three partitioning powers, returned to Leipzig, where he was met with demands to start planning one as soon as possible. In September he clandestinely crossed the Polish border to conduct personal observations and meet with sympathetic high-ranking officers in the residual Polish Army, including General Józef Wodzicki. The preparations went slowly, and he left for Italy, planning to return in February 1794. However, the situation in Poland was changing rapidly. The Russian and Prussian governments forced Poland to again disband most of her army, and the reduced units were to be incorporated into the Russian Army. In March, Tsarist agents discovered the revolutionaries in Warsaw and began arresting notable Polish politicians and military commanders. Kościuszko was forced to execute his plan earlier than he had intended and, on 15 March 1794, set off for Kraków.

Kościuszko Uprising

Learning that the Russian garrison had departed Kraków, Kościuszko entered the city on the night of 23 March 1794. The next morning, in the Main Square, he announced an uprising.  Kościuszko received the title of Naczelnik (commander-in-chief) of Polish–Lithuanian forces fighting against the Russian occupation.

Kościuszko gathered an army of some 6,000, including 4,000 regular soldiers and 2,000 recruits, and marched on Warsaw. The Russians succeeded in organizing an army to oppose him more quickly than he had expected. Still, he scored a victory at Racławice on 4 April 1794, where he turned the tide by personally leading an infantry charge of peasant volunteers (kosynierzy, scythemen). Nonetheless, this Russian defeat was not strategically significant, and the Russian forces quickly forced Kościuszko to retreat toward Kraków. Near Połaniec he received reinforcements and met with other Uprising leaders (Kołłątaj, Potocki); at Połaniec he issued a major political declaration of the Uprising, the Proclamation of Połaniec. The declaration stated that serfs were entitled to civil rights and reduced their work obligations (corvée).  Meanwhile, the Russians set a bounty for Kościuszko's capture, "dead or alive".

By June, the Prussians had begun actively aiding the Russians, and on 6 June 1794, Kościuszko fought a defensive battle against a Prussian–Russian force at Szczekociny. From late June, for several weeks, he defended Warsaw, controlled by the insurgents. On 28 June, a mob of insurgents in Warsaw captured and hanged Bishop Ignacy Massalski and six others. Kościuszko issued a public reproach, writing, "What happened in Warsaw yesterday filled my heart with bitterness and sorrow", and urging, successfully, that rule of law be followed. By the morning of 6 September, the Prussian forces having been withdrawn to suppress an uprising underway in Greater Poland, the siege of Warsaw was lifted. On 10 October, during a sortie against a new Russian attack, Kościuszko was wounded and captured at Maciejowice. He was imprisoned by the Russians at Saint Petersburg in the Peter and Paul Fortress. Soon afterwards, the uprising ended with the Battle of Praga, where according to a contemporary Russian witness, the Russian troops massacred 20,000 Warsaw residents. The subsequent Third Partition of Poland ended the existence of a sovereign Polish and Lithuanian state for the next 123 years.

Later life

The death of Tsaritsa Catherine the Great on 17 November 1796 led to a change in Russia's policies toward Poland. On 28 November, Tsar Paul I, who had hated Catherine, pardoned Kościuszko and set him free after he had tendered an oath of loyalty. Paul promised to free all Polish political prisoners held in Russian prisons and forcibly settled in Siberia. The Tsar gave Kościuszko 12,000 rubles, which the Pole later, in 1798, attempted to return, when also renouncing the oath.

Kościuszko left for the United States, via Stockholm, Sweden and London, departing from Bristol on 17 June 1797, and arriving in Philadelphia on 18 August.  Though welcomed by the populace, he was viewed with suspicion by the American government, controlled by the Federalists, who distrusted Kościuszko for his previous association with the Democratic-Republican Party.

In March 1798, Kościuszko received a bundle of letters from Europe. The news in one of them came as a shock to him, causing him, still in his wounded condition, to spring from his couch and limp unassisted to the middle of the room and exclaim to General Anthony Walton White, "I must return at once to Europe!" The letter in question contained news that Polish General Jan Henryk Dąbrowski and Polish soldiers were fighting in France under Napoleon and that Kościuszko's sister had sent his two nephews in Kościuszko's name to serve in Napoleon's ranks. Around that time Kościuszko also received news that Talleyrand was seeking Kościuszko's moral and public endorsement for the French fight against one of Poland's partitioners, Prussia.

The call of family and country drew Kościuszko back to Europe. He immediately consulted then Vice President of the United States Thomas Jefferson, who procured a passport for him under a false name and arranged for his secret departure for France. Kościuszko left no word for either Julian Ursyn Niemcewicz, his former comrade-in-arms and fellow St. Petersburg prisoner, or for his servant, leaving only some money for them.

Other factors contributed to his decision to depart. His French connections meant that he was vulnerable to deportation or imprisonment under the terms of the Alien and Sedition Acts. Jefferson was concerned that the U.S. and France were on the brink of war after the XYZ Affair and regarded him as an informal envoy. Kościuszko later wrote, "Jefferson considered that I would be the most effective intermediary in bringing an accord with France, so I accepted the mission even if without any official authorization."

Disposition of American estate

Before Kościuszko left for France, he collected his back pay, wrote a will, and entrusted it to Jefferson as executor. Kościuszko and Jefferson had become close friends by 1797 and thereafter corresponded for twenty years in a spirit of mutual admiration. Jefferson wrote that "He is as pure a son of liberty as I have ever known." In the will, Kościuszko left his American estate to be sold to buy the freedom of black slaves, including Jefferson's own, and to educate them for independent life and work.

Several years after Kościuszko's death, Jefferson, aged 77, pleaded an inability to act as executor due to age and the numerous legal complexities of the bequest. It was tied up in the courts until 1856. Jefferson recommended his friend John Hartwell Cocke, who also opposed slavery, as executor, but Cocke likewise declined to execute the bequest.

The case of Kościuszko's American estate reached the U.S. Supreme Court three times. Kościuszko had made four wills, three of which postdated the American one.

None of the money that Kościuszko had earmarked for the manumission and education of African Americans in the United States was ever used for that purpose. Though the American will was never carried out as defined, its legacy was used to found an educational institute at Newark, New Jersey, in 1826, for African Americans in the United States. It was named for Kościuszko.

Return to Europe

Kościuszko arrived in Bayonne, France, on 28 June 1798. By that time, Talleyrand's plans had changed and no longer included him. Kościuszko remained politically active in Polish émigré circles in France, and on 7 August 1799, he joined the Society of Polish Republicans (Towarzystwo Republikanów Polskich). Kościuszko refused the offered command of Polish Legions being formed for service with France. On 17 October and 6 November 1799, he met with Napoleon Bonaparte. He failed to reach an agreement with the French general, who regarded Kościuszko as a "fool" who "overestimated his influence" in Poland. Kościuszko disliked Napoleon for his dictatorial aspirations and called him the "undertaker of the [French] Republic". In 1807, Kościuszko settled in château de Berville, near La Genevraye, distancing himself from politics.

Kościuszko did not believe that Napoleon would restore Poland in any durable form.  When Napoleon's forces approached the borders of Poland, Kościuszko wrote him a letter, demanding guarantees of parliamentary democracy and substantial national borders, which Napoleon ignored. Kościuszko concluded that Napoleon had created the Duchy of Warsaw in 1807 only as an expedient, not because he supported Polish sovereignty. Consequently, Kościuszko did not move to the Duchy of Warsaw or join the new Army of the Duchy, allied with Napoleon.

After the fall of Napoleon, he met with Russia's Tsar Alexander I, in Paris and then in Braunau, Switzerland. The Tsar hoped that Kościuszko could be convinced to return to Poland, where the Tsar planned to create a new, Russian-allied Polish state (the Congress Kingdom). In return for his prospective services, Kościuszko demanded social reforms and restoration of territory, which he wished would reach the Dvina and Dnieper Rivers in the east. However, soon afterwards, in Vienna, Kościuszko learned that the Kingdom of Poland to be created by the Tsar would be even smaller than the earlier Duchy of Warsaw. Kościuszko called such an entity "a joke".

On 2 April 1817, Kościuszko emancipated the peasants in his remaining lands in Poland, but Tsar Alexander disallowed this. Suffering from poor health and old wounds, Kościuszko died in Solothurn at age 71 after falling from a horse, developing a fever, and suffering a stroke a few days later on 15 October 1817.

Funerals
Kościuszko's first funeral was held on 19 October 1817, at a formerly Jesuit church in Solothurn. As news of his death spread, masses and memorial services were held in partitioned Poland. His embalmed body was deposited in a crypt of the Solothurn church. In 1818, Kościuszko's body was transferred to Kraków, arriving at St. Florian's Church on 11 April 1818.  On 22 June 1818, or 23 June 1819 (accounts vary), to the tolling of the Sigismund Bell and the firing of cannon, it was placed in a crypt at Wawel Cathedral, a pantheon of Polish kings and national heroes.

Kościuszko's internal organs, which had been removed during embalming, were separately interred in a graveyard at Zuchwil, near Solothurn. Kościuszko's organs remain there to this day; a large memorial stone was erected in 1820, next to a Polish memorial chapel. However, his heart was not interred with the other organs but instead kept in an urn at the Polish Museum in Rapperswil, Switzerland. The heart, along with the rest of the Museum's holdings, were repatriated back to Warsaw in 1927, where the heart now reposes in a chapel at the Royal Castle.

Memorials and tributes

He has been proclaimed and claimed as a National Hero of Poland, the United States of America, Belarus, and Lithuania.

The Polish historian Stanisław Herbst states in the 1967 Polish Biographical Dictionary that Kościuszko may be Poland's and the world's most popular Pole ever. There are monuments to him around the world, beginning with the Kościuszko Mound at Kraków, erected in 1820–23 by men, women, and children bringing earth from the battlefields where he had fought. The Thaddeus Kosciusko Bridge, a twin bridge structure across the Mohawk River in Albany, New York, completed in 1959, and the Kosciuszko Bridge, built in 1939 in New York City, were named in Kościuszko's honor. The New York City bridge was partially replaced in April 2017 by a new bridge of the same name, with an additional bridge that opened in August 2019. A commemorative plaque dedicated to Tadeusz Kosciuszko was placed on the newly built bridge in October 2022 by the Polish foundation "Będziem Polakami" (We will be Poles) together with the Dobra Polska Szkoła Foundation from New York with financial support from the Polish government.

Kościuszko's 1796 Philadelphia residence is now the Thaddeus Kosciuszko National Memorial, America's smallest national park or unit of the National Park System. There is a Kościuszko Museum at his last residence, in Solothurn, Switzerland. A Polish-American cultural agency, the Kosciuszko Foundation, headquartered in New York City, was created in 1925.

A series of Polish Air Force units have borne the name "Kościuszko Squadron". During World War II a Polish Navy ship bore his name, as did the Polish 1st Tadeusz Kościuszko Infantry Division.

One of the first examples of a historical novel, Thaddeus of Warsaw, was written in Kościuszko's honor by the Scottish author Jane Porter; it proved very popular, particularly in the United States, and went through over eighty editions in the 19th century. An opera, Kościuszko nad Sekwaną (Kościuszko at the Seine), written in the early 1820s, featured music by Franciszek Salezy Dutkiewicz and libretto by Konstanty Majeranowski. Later works have included dramas by Apollo Korzeniowski, Justyn Hoszowski and Władysław Ludwik Anczyc; three novels by Józef Ignacy Kraszewski, one by Walery Przyborowski, one by Władysław Stanisław Reymont; and works by Maria Konopnicka. Kościuszko also appears in non-Polish literature, including a sonnet by Samuel Taylor Coleridge, another by James Henry Leigh Hunt, poems by John Keats and Walter Savage Landor, and a work by Karl Eduard von Holtei.

In 1933, the U.S. Post Office issued a commemorative stamp depicting an engraving of "Brigadier General Thaddeus Kosciuszko," a statue of Kościuszko that stands in Washington, D.C.'s Lafayette Square, near the White House. The stamp was issued on the 150th anniversary of Kościuszko's naturalization as an American citizen. Poland has also issued several stamps in his honor. In 2010, a copy of the monument was unveiled in Warsaw, Poland.

There are statues of Kościuszko in Poland at Kraków (by Leonard Marconi), which was destroyed by German forces during the World War II occupation and was later replaced with a replica by Germany in 1960 and Łódź (by Mieczysław Lubelski); in the United States at Boston, West Point, Philadelphia (by Marian Konieczny), Detroit (a copy of Leonard Marconi's Kraków statue), Washington, D.C., Chicago, Milwaukee and Cleveland; and in Switzerland at Solothurn. Kościuszko has been the subject of paintings by Richard Cosway, Franciszek Smuglewicz, Michał Stachowicz, Juliusz Kossak and Jan Matejko.  A monumental Racławice Panorama was painted by Jan Styka and Wojciech Kossak for the centenary of the 1794 Battle of Racławice. A commemorative monument was built in Minsk, Belarus in 2005.

Geographic features that bear his name include Mount Kosciuszko, the tallest mountain in Australia, excluding external territories. This is in a New South Wales national park also named after him, Kosciuszko National Park. Other geographic entities named after Kościuszko include Kosciusko Island in Alaska, Kosciusko County in Indiana, and numerous cities, towns, streets and parks, particularly in the United States.

Kościuszko has been the subject of many written works.  The first biography of him was published in 1820 by Julian Ursyn Niemcewicz, who served beside Kościuszko as his aide-de-camp and was also imprisoned in Russia after the uprising. English-language biographies have included Monica Mary Gardner's Kościuszko: A Biography, which was first published in 1920, and a 2009 work by Alex Storozynski titled The Peasant Prince: Thaddeus Kosciuszko and the Age of Revolution.

See also
 Kazimierz Pułaski (Anglicized as "Casimir Pulaski"), similarly honored Polish commander in the American Revolutionary War
 Michael Kovats de Fabriczy, Polish commander in the American Revolutionary War, known as "the father of the American cavalry"
 Brigadier General Thaddeus Kosciuszko – a monument in Washington, D.C.
 List of Poles
 Camp Kosciuszko

Explanatory notes

Citations

General bibliography

Books 

 
 
 
 
 , Book (Google), Book (Gutenberg)
 
  E'book
 
 
 
 
 
 
 
 
 
 
 

 
 
 
 
 
 , Book

Other sources

Further reading

External links
 U.S. Kosciuszko National Monument web site.
 Will of Thaddeus Kosciuszko.
 Kosciusko Mississippi.
 Famous Belarusians/Tadeusz Kościuszko
 
 Tadeusz Kosciuszko. Life like a movie

 
1746 births
1817 deaths
Ruthenian nobility of the Polish–Lithuanian Commonwealth
Burials at Wawel Cathedral
Continental Army generals
Continental Army officers from Poland
Generals of the Polish–Lithuanian Commonwealth
Kościuszko insurgents
Members of the American Philosophical Society
People from Ivatsevichy District
People from Brest Litovsk Voivodeship
People of the Polish–Russian War of 1792
Polish emigrants to the United States
Polish engineers
Polish generals in other armies
Polish generals
Polish people of Belarusian descent
Polish politicians
Polish Roman Catholics
Recipients of the Virtuti Militari
Recipients of the Order of the White Eagle (Poland)